Ali Reza Pahlavi (28 April 1966 – 4 January 2011) was a member of the Pahlavi Imperial Family of the Imperial State of Iran. He was the younger son of Mohammad Reza Pahlavi, the former Shah of Iran and his third wife Farah Diba. He was second in order of succession to the Iranian throne before the Iranian Revolution.

Biography 

Alireza Pahlavi was born on 28 April 1966. He attended the Niavaran Palace primary school in Iran but left Iran alongside his family shortly before the Iranian revolution. He moved to the U.S. where he attended Saint David's School in New York City and Mt Greylock Regional High School in Williamstown, Massachusetts. Pahlavi received a BA degree from Princeton University, a MA degree from Columbia University, and was studying at Harvard University as a PhD student in ancient Iranian studies and philology at the time of his death.

He was engaged in 2001 to Sarah Tabatabai, but it seems that the relationship ended some time afterwards. In 2007 he began his relationship with Dr. Raha Didevar, and in 2010 they got engaged. He was once voted as one of the "world's most eligible princes."

Death 
After a long period of depression, on 4 January 2011 Pahlavi died in his apartment in the South End, Boston, (141 West Newton Street) from a self-inflicted gunshot wound.

Mahnaz Afkhami, the former Iranian Minister of Women's Affairs of the Shah's government, told the BBC World Service that Pahlavi and his family being forced into exile in 1979 was very "traumatic" for him and that he had experienced a "loss of identity" in exile. Alireza's sister, Leila Pahlavi also had committed suicide—in June 2001. Close family friends say that Alireza became very depressed after the death of his sister to whom he was very close. He was survived by his mother, Farah Pahlavi, his older brother Reza, his sister Farahnaz, half-sister Shahnaz and daughter Iryana Leila Pahlavi, who was born to his partner Raha Didevar after his death.

His brother Reza Pahlavi said that his wish was to be cremated and for his ashes to be scattered in the Caspian Sea.

On 23 January 2011, an official memorial was held in The Music Center at Strathmore in Bethesda, Maryland. The memorial was attended by the former Iranian imperial family and thousands of Iranians.

Ancestry

References

External links 

 Shah's Son Killed himself BBC
 Pahlavi Dynasty's Website
 Empress Farah Pahlavi Official Web Site
 Britannica Online - Pahlavi Dynasty
 Devoted to Aryamehr

Ali Reza
1966 births
2011 deaths
Columbia University alumni
Harvard University alumni
Iranian royalty
Sons of emperors
Iranian emigrants to the United States
People from Tehran
Mohammad Reza Pahlavi
Princeton University alumni
Suicides by firearm in Massachusetts
Exiles of the Iranian Revolution in the United States
Zoroastrian studies scholars
Mazandarani people
2011 suicides